The following is a listing of officially released works by the English band Porcupine Tree. The band has released eleven major studio albums and 7 EPs, as well as many limited editions and revamped material.

At the time Steven Wilson was going to sign to the Delerium label, he owned a lot of material recorded during the mid- and later '80s that he had recorded subsequently on three demo tapes - Tarquin's Seaweed Farm, Love, Death & Mussolini and The Nostalgia Factory. He sent copies of those tapes to people he felt would be interested in the recordings, asking them to spread the word. Delerium originally intended to release all of that material in a double debut album, but Wilson decided to just pick the songs he considered the best ones. These songs were mastered to make Porcupine Tree's first studio album, On the Sunday of Life... (1992); all of the leftover tracks would be later released on a compilation album called Yellow Hedgerow Dreamscape (1994).

Richard Barbieri and Colin Edwin met Steven Wilson to play on a few songs he was working on. Again, there was a number of songs written that would perfectly fit on a double album, but one of these songs saw the light prior to the release of their second studio album on the Voyage 34 (1992) single, thereafter followed by Voyage 34: Remixes (1993), and the other material ended up on the Staircase Infinities (1994) EP. Finally, ten tracks were chosen for their next studio album, Up the Downstair (1993), which Melody Maker described as "a psychedelic masterpiece". At the end of 1993, Chris Maitland joined the band for live shows and would later record some drums and percussions for three songs of Porcupine Tree's third studio album, The Sky Moves Sideways (1995), an album that made the press refer them as the "Pink Floyd of the nineties". They did not record as a full band until Signify (1996), the first Porcupine Tree album to be performed entirely by the four members. It contained shorter compositions and less improvisation than its predecessors.

The next album was delayed for almost three years as the band was looking for a new record label after finishing their deal with Delerium. In the meantime, they launched Metanoia (1998), a compilation of improvisations recorded during the Signify sessions, some of which were later shaped into songs. Finally, they signed to Snapper/K-Scope and the album Stupid Dream (1999) was issued. The album was a departure in style from all their previous works, in favour of a more song-oriented direction, as a consequence this alienated some older fans but brought a lot of new ones. Its follow-up, Lightbulb Sun (2000), assured the fan base and solidified the ground of its predecessor. For this one, they worked with Dave Gregory of XTC, who provided string arrangements. A collection of EP tracks and out-takes from the previous two albums was launched a year after under the title of Recordings (2001).

In Absentia (2002) became one of their most successful works, remaining a favourite to many fans, charting in many European countries and selling over 100,000 copies in its first year of release. The album was the first release to feature Gavin Harrison, replacing Maitland on drums. Deadwing (2005) appeared the Billboard chart at number 132 of the Billboard 200 (which was the first entry the band achieved on the Billboard chart) and was voted the second-best album of 2005 in Sound & Vision, the most widely distributed US magazine in the field of home electronics and entertainment.

Porcupine Tree's next studio album, Fear of a Blank Planet (2007), debuted at number 59 on the Billboard 200, won the Album of the Year award for the 2007 edition of the Classic Rock magazine awards, and was nominated for a Grammy Award in the Best Surround Sound Album category. The album features collaborations with Rush's guitarist Alex Lifeson and King Crimson's Robert Fripp. The title is a play on words relating to Public Enemy's Fear of a Black Planet album.

On 2007 they collaborated with Yoko Ono on the song "Death of Samantha", in Ono's remix album Yes, I'm a Witch.

In September 2007, they released Nil Recurring, an EP of four leftover tracks from the recording sessions for Fear of a Blank Planet. It was released on Transmission, the band's own record label as a limited edition of 5000 copies that did not take long to sell out through the band's online store, Burning Shed, forcing the band to keep printing more copies. Nevertheless, the EP was reissued on 18 February 2008 on Peaceville Records.

An in-store appearance at Park Avenue CDs in Orlando, Florida from 4 October 2007, was recorded and released on CD under the name of We Lost the Skyline. The title is a reference to the lyrics on "The Sky Moves Sideways (Phase One)". The album was released on vinyl on 21 March 2008 and is the first official acoustic live record to be officially released by the band.

A live album from the Fear of a Blank Planet tour, Ilosaarirock, was released in March 2009. It was recorded from their performance at the Ilosaarirock Festival on 14 July 2007. However, this album was only released to members of the Residents of a Blank Planet ticketing club.

On 15 September 2009, the band's tenth studio album was released, titled The Incident, the title track being one solid 55-minute epic. It quickly became the best selling Porcupine Tree album in the world charts to date.

Another live album from the Fear of a Blank Planet tour, Atlanta, was released in June 2010 in order to help raise funds for Mick Karn's treatment for cancer.

The band went on indefinite hiatus in 2010, after which the members focused on their solo work and other projects. In November 2021, Wilson, Barbieri and Harrison announced the reunion of the band, now as a trio with Edwin not returning as a bassist. The eleventh studio album Closure/Continuation, which is the band's first studio album in 13 years, was released on 24 June 2022.

Albums

Studio albums

Live albums

Compilation albums

Box sets

Extended plays

Demo tapes

Singles

Notes:

Promotional singles

Videos

Video albums

Music videos

Notes
a. "The Cross" which appeared on the original CD edition was replaced by the track "Out" (from 1987) on the vinyl edition. The version of "Radioactive Toy" here is the original cassette version as opposed to the re-recorded and extended version on On the Sunday of Life.... "Mute" is a newer mix to the one on the cassette. "An Empty Box" had not appeared on either cassette but is another recording from the same period. Note that the vinyl edition corrects some factual errors and therefore dates some of the material back to 1984.
b. Most of these tracks appeared either on the album On the Sunday of Life... or the limited edition CD Yellow Hedgerow Dreamscape. However, for the CD issue tracks 3 and 4/5 were retitled "Third Eye Surfer" and "On the Sunday of Life..." respectively. Also the version of "Mute" here is an earlier mix.
c. 40-minute tape private pressing of only 10 copies. Contains 7 tracks later to appear on The Nostalgia Factory, plus "Out" (later included on the vinyl edition of Yellow Hedgerow Dreamscape) and the elsewhere unavailable "It Will Rain for a Million Years" (a completely different track to the one with the same title included on On the Sunday of Life...)
d. Most of these tracks appeared either on the album On the Sunday of Life... or the limited edition CD Yellow Hedgerow Dreamscape. "Colours Dance Angels Kiss" and "Hokey Cokey" were later retitled "Track 11" and "Execution of the Will of the Marquis de Sade" respectively. "The Nostalgia Factory" is an earlier version to that on On the Sunday of Life... and "Queen Quotes Crowley" and "This Long Silence" are both about a minute longer than the versions later released on CD. An edit of the track "Sinatra Rape Scene" appears on Up the Downstair as "Monuments Burn into Moments".
e. Full show from the Deadwing tour filmed at Park West, Chicago in October 2005, edited by Lasse Hoile, with the soundtrack mixed in stereo and 5.1 surround sound, live performances of "Futile" and "Radioactive Toy" from German TV show Rockpalast, the "Lazarus" promo clip, the live films used during the show for "Start of Something Beautiful", "Halo", and "Mother and Child Divided", Gavin Harrison's "Cymbal Song", and a photo gallery. 
f. A special edition has been made available in April, with a regular version following in May. Anesthetize was filmed live over 2 nights in Tilburg, The Netherlands in October 2008, at the end of the Fear of a Blank Planet tour. The 130-minute live film includes a complete performance of the Blank Planet album and 11 other tracks, and was directed and edited by Lasse Hoile on high definition cameras, with the soundtrack mixed into stereo and 5.1 sound. The special edition was released in the form of a cloth bound hard back 120-page book (as per The Incident and Insurgentes deluxe versions) featuring live photography of the band taken over the last 5 years. The book includes both a DVD and a much higher quality Blu-ray disc version of the film, as well as 2 audio CDs of the soundtrack including one bonus track not featured in the film. The book and audio CDs are not included with the standard retail versions of the Blu-ray/DVD.

References

External links
Porcupine Tree Official Website

Discography
Heavy metal group discographies
Discographies of British artists